Shanice Parker (born 16 May 1998) is an Australian professional rugby league footballer who currently plays for the Newcastle Knights in the NRL Women's Premiership.

She previously played for the Sydney Roosters in the NRLW and North Sydney Bears in the NSWRL Women's Premiership.

Background
Born in Yangebup, Western Australia, Parker grew up playing rugby league for the Willagee Bears. She stopped playing league when she was 12 and began playing rugby union when she was 15. Her mother, Danielle, represented Australia at the 2000 Women's Rugby League World Cup.

Playing career

Rugby union
In 2015, Parker represented Australia at the 2015 Commonwealth Youth Games. In 2016, she was contracted to the Australian sevens team.

In 2018, she moved to Sydney and joined the NSW Waratahs Super W team, winning Grand Finals with the team in 2018 and 2019. In 2019, she represented Australia.

Rugby league
In 2018, Parker returned to rugby league, joining the North Sydney Bears NSWRL Women's Premiership team.

In May 2019, she represented NSW City at the Women's National Championships. In June 2019, she joined the Sydney Roosters NRL Women's Premiership team. In Round 3 of the 2019 NRL Women's season, she made her debut for the Roosters in their 16–24 loss to the St George Illawarra Dragons.

On 20 February 2021, she represented the Māori All Stars, scoring a try in their 24–0 win over the Indigenous All Stars.

In June 2022, Parker signed with the Newcastle Knights for the 2022 season. She made her club debut for the Knights in round 1 of the 2022 NRLW season against the Brisbane Broncos.

On 2 October 2022, Parker played in the Knights' 32-12 NRLW Grand Final win over the Parramatta Eels.

In October 2022, she was selected for the New Zealand squad at the delayed 2021 Women's Rugby League World Cup in England.

References

External links
Newcastle Knights profile
NRL.com profile
Sydney Roosters profile

1998 births
Living people
Australian female rugby league players
Australian female rugby union players
Australia women's international rugby union players
New Zealand Māori rugby league players
Rugby union wings
Rugby league wingers
Rugby league centres
Sydney Roosters (NRLW) players
Newcastle Knights (NRLW) players
Rugby league players from Perth, Western Australia
New Zealand female rugby league players
New Zealand women's national rugby league team players